Andrew Scott Norman Wightman  is a senior British civil servant and former diplomat. Before his appointment as Director for External Affairs in the Scottish Government, Wightman was High Commissioner of the United Kingdom to Singapore from 2015 to 2019, succeeding Antony Phillipson. Prior to this, Wightman was British Ambassador to South Korea between 2011 and January 2015.

He studied French at the University of Edinburgh.

Career

Foreign and Commonwealth Office

Wightman joined the Foreign and Commonwealth Office in 1983. He has had several posts in China and Europe. He was FCO Director for Global and Economic Issues between 2006 and 2008, then Director for Asia Pacific until his first post as Ambassador to South Korea in 2011. Wightman was appointed Companion of the Order of St Michael and St George in the 2009 New Year Honours.

In February 2015, it was announced that Wightman would assume the post of the High Commissioner of the United Kingdom to Singapore in May 2015.

Wightman's term as High Commissioner ended in July 2019, and he was succeeded by Kara Owens .

Scottish Civil Service

Wightman was appointed Director for External Affairs for the Scottish government in June 2019.

References

Year of birth missing (living people)
Living people
Companions of the Order of St Michael and St George
British diplomats in East Asia
Ambassadors of the United Kingdom to South Korea
High Commissioners of the United Kingdom to Singapore